Poli-ye Sofla (also Romanized as Polī-ye Soflá; also known as Pūlī-ye Pā’īn) is a village in Golidagh Rural District, Golidagh District, Maraveh Tappeh County, Golestan Province, Iran. At the 2006 census, its population was 641, in 107 families.

References 

Populated places in Maraveh Tappeh County